The Sony α NEX-3N is an entry level rangefinder-styled digital mirrorless interchangeable lens camera announced by Sony on 20 February 2013.

References
http://www.dpreview.com/products/sony/slrs/sony_nex3n/specifications

NEX-3N
NEX-3N
Live-preview digital cameras
Cameras introduced in 2013